Polyteloptera is a genus of picture-winged flies in the family Ulidiidae. There is at least one described species in Polyteloptera, P. apotropa.

References

Ulidiidae
Articles created by Qbugbot